Chaerodrys is a genus of obese weevils (insects in the family Brachyceridae).

 Names brought to synonymy
 Chaerodrys elegans Faust, 1890, a synonym for Metadrosus bellus

References 

 Reitter, E. 1908: Übersicht der mir bekannten Arten der Curculioniden-Üntergattung Chaerodrys Duv. Entomologische Blätter 4: 32–34.

External links 
 
 
 
 Chaerodrys at insectoid.info

Weevil genera
Brachycerinae